Sobota is the Polish, Czech, Slovak and Slovenian word for Saturday. It appears to be the names of Polish towns holding Saturday weekly fairs. 

Sobota is also a Czech and Slovak common surname.

Sobota may refer to the following places in Poland:
Sobota, Lower Silesian Voivodeship (south-west Poland)
Sobota, Łódź Voivodeship (central Poland)
Sobota, Greater Poland Voivodeship (west-central Poland)

It might also refer to:
Rimavská Sobota, a town in southern Slovakia
Murska Sobota, a town in northeastern Slovenia.
 Saturday, a 1945 Czech film directed by Václav Wasserman